The following is a list of the presidents and executive secretaries of the Religious Education Association.

The Religious Education Association is a nonprofit member association, serving as a professional and learned society for scholars and researchers involved in the field of religious education.  In 2003 it merged formally with the Association of Professors and Researchers in Religious Education. Up until that date, REA presidents could serve for more than a year at a time, while APRRE presidents served for only one year at a time. At the moment of merger, presidential terms were limited to one year and "practitioners" was added to the title of the organization, making it the "Religious Education Association: An Association of Professors, Practitioners and Researchers in Religious Education" (REA: APPRRE).

Presidents of the REA

1903-04 : Frank Knight Sanders
1904-05 : Charles Cuthbert Hall
1905-06 : William Fraser McDowell
1906-07 : William Hubert P. Faunce
1907-08 : Henry Churchill King
1908-09 : Francis Greenwood Peabody
1909-10 : George Albert Coe
1910-11 : William Lawrence
1911-12 : James Hampton Kirkland
1912-13 : Harry Pratt Judson
1913-14 : Charles Franklin Thwing
1914-15 : Charles David Williams
1915-16 : George Black Stewart
1916-17 : Francis J. McConnell 
1917-18 : Washington Gladden
1918-19 : Samuel A. Elliott
1919-21 : Arthur C. McGiffert 
1921-24 : Theodore G. Soares
1924-26 : Donald J. Cowling
1926-28 : Robert A. Falconer
1928-31 : William Adams Brown
1931-33 : John H. Finley
1933-35 : Herbert N. Shenton
1935-39 : Hugh Hartshorne
1940-42 : Harrison Elliott
1942-44 : Ernest Chave
1944-46 : F. Ernest Johnson
1946-48 : Ernest W. Kuebler 
1948-55 : Samuel P. Franklin
1955-57 : George N. Shuster
1957-62 : Jerome Kerwin
1962-67 : Philip Scharper
1967-69 : David R. Hunter
1969-72 : Oswald P. Bronson, Sr.
1972-75 : Sr. Ann Ida Gannon, BVM
1975-77 : Rabbi David Wolf Silverman
1977-79 : Emily V. Gibbs
1979-81 : Henry C. Simmons, C.P. 
1981-85 : Rabbi Walter Jacob
1985-89 : Joanne Chafe
1989-1993 : Mary Elizabeth Moore
1993-97 : Stephen B. Scharper
1997-99 : Noel B. Shuell
1999-2000 : Sherry Blumberg
2000-02 : Ronald H. Cram

Presidents of the APRRE

1970-71 : Allen J. Moore
1971-72 : Neely D. McCarter
1972-73 : C. Ellis Nelson
1973-74 : Iris V. Cully
1974-75 : Berard L. Marthaler
1975-76 : Gerald A. Slusser
1976-77 : Norma H. Thompson 
1977-78 : Clarence H. Snelling, Jr. 
1978-79 : Mary Charles Bryce, O.S.B.
1979-80 : David S. Stewart
1980-81 : Margaret Webster
1981-82 : Charles F. Melchert
1982-83 : Lucie W. Barber
1983-84 : Donald M. Joy
1984-85 : Taylor Mcconnell
1985-86 : Joanmarie Smith
1986-87 : Richard A. Olson
1987-88 : Maria Harris
1988-89 : Robert Browning
1989-90 : Gloria Durka
1990-91 : Gabriel Moran
1991-92 : William B. Kennedy
1992-93 : Susanne Johnson
1993-94 : Stephen Schmidt
1994-95 : Mary C. Boys
1995-96 : Charles Foster
1996-97 : Fayette Breaux Veverka
1997-98 : Mary Elizabeth Mullino Moore 
1998-99 : Thomas Groome
1999-2000 : Sara S. Lee
2000-01 : Jack Seymour
2001-02 : Greer A. Wenh-In Ng

Presidents of the REA:APPRRE

2002-03 : Anne Streaty Wimberly
2003-04 : Lorna Bowman
2004-05 : Robert O’Gorman
2005-06 : Ronnie Prevost 
2006-07 : Margaret Ann Crain
2007-08 : José Irizarry
2008-09 : Carol Lakey Hess
2009-10 : Maureen O’ Brien
2010-11 : Mary Hess
2011-12 : Dean Blevins
2012-13 : Yolanda Smith
2013-14 : Siebren Miedema
2014-15 : Mai-Anh Le Tran
2015-16 : Harold (Bud) Horell
2016-17: Bert Roebben
2017-2018: Mualla Selcuk
2018-2019: Kathy Winings
2019-2020: Hanan Alexander
2020-2021: Boyung Lee
2022-2023: Patrick Reyes

REA General Secretaries

1970-82 : Boardman (Barney) Kathan 
1982-85 : Randolph Crump Miller 
1985-87 : Dorothy Savage
1987-92 : Donald T. Russo
1992-97 : Barbara B. Ryan
1997-2002 : Ronald Cram

Executive Secretaries, APRRE

1970-90 : Donald F. Williams
1990-91 : Clarisse Croteau-Chonka and Burton Everist 
1991-94 : Padraic O’Hare
1994-2001 : Charles F. Melchert
2001-03 : Randy Litchfield

Executive Secretaries, REA:APPRRE

2002-03 : Randy Litchfield
2004-06 : Lawanda Smith
2006-10 : W. Alan Smith 
2010–2020 : Lucinda Huffaker
2020-present : Lakisha Lockhart

References

Religion and education
Religious education
Learned societies of the United States
Interfaith organizations